Frances Whyte is a former Scottish international lawn and indoor bowler.

Bowls career
Whyte won a gold medal in the fours at the 1985 World Outdoor Bowls Championship in Melbourne. Seven years later she won two more golds in both the triples and the fours at the 1992 World Outdoor Bowls Championship in Worthing. She also won a gold medal in the pairs at the 1994 Commonwealth Games in Victoria with Sarah Gourlay.

In 1993 she won the fours gold medal at the inaugural Atlantic Bowls Championships. Two years later she repeated the success winning the fours gold again in Durban.

References

Scottish female bowls players
Living people
Date of birth missing (living people)
Bowls World Champions
Year of birth missing (living people)
Commonwealth Games medallists in lawn bowls
Commonwealth Games gold medallists for Scotland
Bowls players at the 1994 Commonwealth Games
Medallists at the 1994 Commonwealth Games